The 2021 ARCA Menards Series season was the 69th season of the ARCA Menards Series, a stock car racing series sanctioned by NASCAR in the United States. The season began at Daytona International Speedway with the Lucas Oil 200 on February 13 and ended with the Reese's 150 at Kansas Speedway on October 23. Ty Gibbs was crowned the series champion, having won ten times and finished in the top four in 19 of 20 races.

This season also featured a historic first, as Fox pit reporter Jamie Little became the first woman to serve as a TV play-by-play announcer in motorsports history, as she took over that role for the network's ARCA races.

Teams and drivers
Note: If a driver is listed as their own crew chief for a particular race, that means that their entry in that race was a start and park.

Complete schedule

Limited schedule

Notes

Changes

Teams
 On November 13, 2020, it was announced that Lira Motorsports would be returning to the series for the first time since 2017, fielding a part-time entry for late model and NASCAR Roots driver Logan Misuraca. She and the team also announced that they would run part-time in the Truck Series in 2021. They started the season at ARCA's preseason test session at Daytona in January where Misuraca was initially on the entry list in a No. 33 car for Lira, which was later withdrawn. Misuraca revealed in an interview in April that her deal with Lira had fallen through. 
 On December 8, 2020, Ken Schrader confirmed that he would be closing down his longtime ARCA team, Ken Schrader Racing, which would only keep its dirt racing operations in 2021. This will be the first season since 1990 where KSR has not competed in the series. Schrader's iconic No. 52 car only competed part-time from 2018 to 2020 due to lack of sponsorship. NASCAR Whelen Modified Tour driver Andy Jankowiak bought some of the assets of Schrader's team to form his own team, Jankowiak Motorsports, and make his debut in the series. They entered the No. 73 car for Jankowiak at Daytona, Talladega, Charlotte, Pocono, Watkins Glen and Bristol.
 On December 22, 2020, it was announced that Mullins Racing would be entering a second car in the season-opener at Daytona. However, due to a lack of sponsorship, this did not end up happening. It would have been the first time they fielded a second car by themselves, as Mullins partnered with other teams to lease their owner points in 2017 and 2018 for Robert Bruce to drive a second Mullins car in the race at Elko both years.
 On December 23, 2020, it was announced that Greg Van Alst, who last competed in the series in 2002, would be starting his own team, the No. 35 Chevy, and running a part-time schedule after buying a car from the closed Chad Bryant Racing.
 On January 8, 2021, ThePitLane revealed that Nick Sanchez would be competing full-time for Rev Racing in the main ARCA Menards Series in 2021, making it the team's first time fielding a full-time car in the series. Sanchez previously competed full-time for Rev Racing in the East Series in 2020 and part-time in 2019. The official announcement of this came on January 15, where it was also revealed that Sanchez would be using the No. 6. However, Sanchez instead ended up using the No. 2.
 On January 14, 2021, it was announced that Win-Tron Racing would merge into AM Racing, a Truck Series team that they have had an alliance with for multiple years and that they have shared a race shop with beginning in 2020. Howie DiSavino III will continue to drive part-time in the team's No. 32 car.
 On January 14, 2021, Truck Series team Young's Motorsports announced that they would expand into the ARCA Menards Series, fielding the No. 02 car on a part-time basis beginning at Daytona. The team participated in the series' Daytona testing in January with Kris Wright (one of their full-time Truck Series drivers) and Toni Breidinger driving. Their first race came at Daytona with Breidinger, who will run a part-time schedule with the team, with it being her first time in the series since 2018.

Drivers
 On September 15, 2020, it was announced that Sam Mayer, who drove the No. 21 car for GMS Racing part-time in the ARCA Menards Series along with the full season in the East Series (where he won the championship), would move up to the Xfinity Series in June 2021, driving the JR Motorsports No. 8 car, in the second half of the season after he turns 18 and is eligible to race in the series. On November 2, 2020, GMS announced that Jack Wood will drive for them full-time in the East Series and in all of the Showdown races in the main ARCA Menards Series, replacing Mayer in the No. 21. Wood previously drove part-time in the ARCA Menards Series West, fielding his own team, Velocity Racing. The team ended up changing plans again, as Wood instead began driving in the main ARCA Series full-time instead of the East Series. Their full season plans were soon cancelled, as Wood and the team would skip the races at Toledo (in order for him to compete in the Truck Series race at Circuit of the Americas, also driving for GMS) and Mid-Ohio. Soon after, GMS would promote Wood to the Truck Series full-time in their No. 24 truck, and after that, he would only run the Watkins Glen and Bristol ARCA races.
 On December 15, 2020, it was announced that Michael Self, the championship runner-up for the past two years, would be leaving ARCA in 2021 to take a non-driving position with Trans-Am team Silver Hare Racing, becoming the team's general manager. Venturini replaced Self in the No. 25 with multiple drivers. Gracie Trotter, Derek Griffith, Parker Chase, Brandon Jones, Chandler Smith, Jesse Love, and Toni Breidinger all drove the car during the season.
 On December 18, 2020, David Gilliland Racing announced that Joey Iest would join the team to drive in six or more East Series races for the team. Because the 2021 East Series schedule features 8 races, and 3 of them being combination races with the big ARCA Menards Series, at least one of Iest's six races will be in a combination race. Iest ended up driving the full season in the East Series and all 3 combination races in the team's No. 54 car.
 On April 8, 2021, Taylor Gray suffered a fractured L4 vertebra, left foot, and ankle in a single-car accident in Statesville, NC. On July 6, David Gilliland Racing announced that he had recovered and would return to complete the remainder of his scheduled starts, beginning with the race at Elko.
 On July 28, 2021, it was announced that Toni Breidinger would be leaving Young's Motorsports to re-join Venturini Motorsports, the team she drove for part-time in the series in 2018. The races that she ran for them in her part-time schedule are Winchester, Springfield and DuQuoin in the No. 25, and Kansas in the No. 55.
 After being far enough behind to Ty Gibbs and Corey Heim for 1st and 2nd the standings, 3rd and 4th place drivers Thad Moffitt and Nick Sanchez skipped both of the dirt races (Springfield and DuQuoin). Moffitt was replaced in the No. 46 by his DGR teammate Taylor Gray. The No. 17 car, which Gray normally drives, was not entered in those races. Sanchez was replaced by dirt track racing driver Landen Lewis in the No. 2 car, and Rev Racing leased the owner points to Rette Jones Racing, who fielded the entry in a collaboration with 2017 series champion Austin Theriault in those races.

Crew chiefs
 On December 9, 2020, it was announced that Mardy Lindley, who crew chiefed the No. 21 of Sam Mayer for GMS Racing in 2019 and 2020, would be joining Kyle Busch Motorsports in the Truck Series to crew chief their No. 51. Lindley had originally been announced to return to GMS Racing in 2021 to crew chief Jack Wood, Mayer's replacement.

Manufacturers
 On December 22, 2020, Willie Mullins announced that his No. 3 car would be a Chevy at Daytona. He bought the car from the closed KBR Development team, which was the same one that David Gravel and Brandon McReynolds drove in the 2020 and 2019 Daytona races, respectively, and that Sheldon Creed drove at Daytona in 2018 for MDM Motorsports. As a result, the Ford that Mullins previously drove in this race was announced to still be used at Daytona and become a new second car for the team with a driver had yet-to-be determined. However, the second car did not end up being fielded at Daytona due to lack of sponsorship.

Schedule
Daytona, Toledo, Pocono, and Talladega revealed their race dates ahead of the release of the entire schedule, which ARCA announced on December 1, 2020. Mid-Ohio, Elko, and DuQuoin received dates on the schedule after all three tracks lost their 2020 race dates due to COVID-19.

Notes: 
 The race at Phoenix in March was a combination race with the ARCA Menards Series West (highlighted in gold).
 Races highlighted in silver were combination events with the ARCA Menards Series East.
 The Sioux Chief Showdown races are listed in bold.

Broadcasting
The TV lineup is similar to what it looked like in 2020, with FS1 airing almost all of the races that occur at tracks that the NASCAR Cup, Xfinity and Truck Series go to and have races at on the same weekend as the ARCA Menards Series and FS1 is at the track to broadcast at least one of those series. The rest of the races are aired on MAVTV. The only races that FS1 is not broadcasting where the Cup, Xfinity and/or Truck Series does have a race at on the same weekend are Phoenix and the season-finale at Kansas, which are both on MAVTV.

FS1 made a change to their broadcasting lineup for their ARCA Menards Series coverage for the 2021 season, as play-by-play announcer Dave Rieff was replaced by longtime NASCAR pit reporter Jamie Little, who became the first woman to ever serve in the play-by-play role on TV in any motorsports series after calling the race at Daytona.

Results and standings

Race results

Drivers' championship

Notes:
 The pole winner also receives 1 bonus point, similar to the previous ARCA points system used until 2019 and unlike NASCAR. 
 Additionally, after groups of 5 races of the season, drivers that compete in all 5 races receive 50 additional points. 
 Corey Heim, Ty Gibbs, Thad Moffitt, Nick Sanchez, and D. L. Wilson received this points bonus for having competed in the first 5 races of the season (Daytona, Phoenix, Talladega, Kansas in May, and Toledo). Heim, Gibbs, Moffitt, Sanchez and Brad Smith received the 50 bonus points for having competed in the next 5 races (Charlotte, Mid-Ohio, Pocono, Elko, and Berlin). Heim, Gibbs and Smith received the 50 bonus points for having competed in the next 5 races (Iowa, Winchester, Watkins Glen, Michigan, and Springfield) and the next 5 races (Milwaukee, DuQuoin, Bristol, Salem, and Kansas in October).

(key) Bold – Pole position awarded by time. Italics – Pole position set by final practice results or rainout. * – Most laps led. ** – All laps led.

See also
 2021 NASCAR Cup Series
 2021 NASCAR Xfinity Series
 2021 NASCAR Camping World Truck Series
 2021 ARCA Menards Series East
 2021 ARCA Menards Series West
 2021 NASCAR Whelen Modified Tour
 2021 NASCAR Pinty's Series
 2021 NASCAR PEAK Mexico Series
 2021 NASCAR Whelen Euro Series
 2021 eNASCAR iRacing Pro Invitational Series
 2021 SRX Series

References

External links
 Official website

ARCA Menards Series seasons
ARCA Menards Series